The Nanaimo Formation is a geologic formation in Washington (state). It preserves fossils dating back to the Cretaceous period.

See also

 List of fossiliferous stratigraphic units in Washington (state)
 Paleontology in Washington (state)

References
 

Cretaceous geology of Washington (state)